Vacuity can refer to:
Emptiness, the human condition
Vacuum, the absence of matter
Śūnyatā, the Buddhist term about the impermanent nature of form 
Vacuity (band), an alternative rock band from Kitchener, Ontario
 A song by French metal band Gojira, from the album The Way Of All Flesh (2008)